West Denton is an area in the western part of the city of Newcastle upon Tyne, Tyne and Wear, England.

Education 

Some of the schools in the area include:

Primary:
Beech Hill Primary School
West Denton Primary School
St John Vianney RC Primary School

Specialist:
Thomas Bewick
Studio West (opened September 2014)

References

External links
 West Denton Primary School website

Districts of Newcastle upon Tyne